Gerd W. Buschhorn (21 June 1934 – 20 January 2010) is the former director of the Max Planck Institute for Physics.

References

Max Planck Institutes
1934 births
2010 deaths
People from Bad Homburg vor der Höhe
20th-century German physicists
Max Planck Institute directors